The Burnelli CBY-3 Loadmaster is an unconventional transport aircraft that was designed by American engineer Vincent Burnelli and built in Canada in 1944 by Canadian Car and Foundry.

Design and development

The CBY-3 "lifting fuselage" was an evolution of the earlier Burnelli UB-14.  Burnelli worked as a designer at Canadian Car and Foundry (CanCar) in Montreal, and the CBY-3 was intended for bush operations in northern Canada. The sole prototype was extensively tested but failed to gain a production contract.

Burnelli had a lifelong career devoted to exploiting the advantages of the lifting body airfoil concept that characterized many of his earlier aircraft designs. His last design, the CBY-3 was manufactured by CanCar in Montreal, but ownership reverted to Burnelli, when the CBY-3 was unable to gain a production contract. The name of the aircraft, CBY-3, was derived from the name of the three partners involved in its creation:  CanCar, Burnelli and Lowell Yerex and "3" from the number of partners involved. Lowell Yerex was a New Zealander who had formed TACA – Transportes Aéreos Centroamericanos (Central American Air Transport) in Honduras in 1931, and joined the project when Burnelli convinced him that the CBY-3 could be used as both a cargo and passenger aircraft.

A follow-up design in 1942 for the CC&F B-1000, a bomber using the same lifting body principles, remained a "paper project".

Operational history

Originally registered CF-BEL-X while still in the experimental stage, this one-off, twin-boom, aerofoil-section fuselage, high-lift airliner garnered significant interest from the industry. CF-BEL-X underwent rigorous testing and proving flights designed to show off its potential. Despite a trouble-free test program and glowing accolades from the press and industry observers, no production orders resulted and the prototype was later sold in the United States as N17N.

Moving to Southampton, New York, Burnelli continued to promote his airfoil-shaped fuselage transport aircraft. In 1955, he adapted the CBY-3 to carry an expedition of 20 passengers and 41 sled dogs, along with their equipment, to the North Pole, but the enterprise was canceled.

The Loadmaster continued to fly regularly as a commercial airliner both in northern Canada and South America; acquired with design rights by Airlifts Inc. in Miami, Florida, it went to Venezuela, and returned to Burnelli Avionics for refitting with Wright R-2600 engines, finally ended its flying days at Baltimore's airport in Maryland.

Aircraft on display

In 1964, the CBY-3 air transport was retired to the New England Air Museum in Windsor Locks, Connecticut, where it was displayed outside. As of November 2020, after an eight-year restoration, the CBY-3 was moved into the Civil Aviation Hangar where the final assembly will be completed.

Specifications (CBY-3)

See also
Burnelli UB-14

References

Further reading
 Townend, David R. Clipped Wings – The History of Aborted Aircraft Projects. Markham, Ontario: AeroFile Publications, 2007. .

External links

 Extensive story of Burnelli's designs
 
 Tracking RANSA’s CBY-3 Loadmaster – LAAHS.com
 After The Track Of The CBY-3 «Loadmaster» Of RANSA (Spanish) – LAAHS.com

CBY-3
1950s Canadian airliners
Canadian Car and Foundry aircraft
Twin-boom aircraft
Aviation history of Canada
Abandoned civil aircraft projects
Lifting bodies
High-wing aircraft
Twin piston-engined tractor aircraft